Phalangipus is a genus of crabs in the family Epialtidae.

Species
Phalangipus australiensis Rathbun, 1918
Phalangipus filiformis Rathbun, 1916
Phalangipus hystrix (Miers, 1886)
Phalangipus indicus (Leach, 1815)
Phalangipus longipes (Linnaeus, 1758)
Phalangipus malakkensis Griffin, 1973
Phalangipus persicus Griffin, 1973
Phalangipus retusus Rathbun, 1916
Phalangipus trachysternus Griffin, 1973

References

Majoidea